The 2014 Finnish League Cup will be the 18th season of the Finnish League Cup, Finland's second-most prestigious cup football tournament. FC Lahti are the defending champions, having won their second league cup last year.

The cup consists of two stages. First there will be a group stage that involves the 12 Veikkausliiga teams divided into four groups. The top two teams from each group will enter the one-legged elimination rounds – quarter-finals, semi-finals and the final.

Group stage
Every team will play every other team of its group twice, both home and away. The group stage matches will be played from January 2014.

Group A

Group B

Group C

Group D

Knockout stage

Quarter-finals

Semi-finals

Final

Topscorers

References

External links
Liigacup at Veikkausliiga site

Finnish League Cup
League Cup
Finnish League Cup